{{Infobox writer
| name           = Saral Sarkar
| native_name    = 
| image          = SARKAR Saral 2010.JPG
| birth_name     = 
| birth_date     = 
| birth_place    = Kalimpong, West Bengal, British India
| death_date     = 
| death_place    = 
| occupation     = Writer, Academic, Activist
| language       = German, English 
| nationality    = 
| notableworks   = Eco-Socialism or Eco-Capitalism? – A Critical Analysis of Humanity's Fundamental Choices"
| spouse         = Maria Mies
| children       = 
| signature      = 
}}

Saral Sarkar (Bengali সরল সরকার), born 10 May 1936 in West Bengal, is an Indian-German academic and eco-socialist political activist. Sarkar taught at the Goethe Institute in Hyderabad from 1966 to 1981, as a lecturer in German. Since 1982, Sarkar has been based in Cologne, and has been a prominent figure in the European ecology and peace movement. Sarkar was also the secretary of the local Green Party of Cologne. In the 1980s, The United Nations University commissioned Sarkar to conduct an authoritative study of the Green movement in West Germany. His resultant two-volume study, Green-Alternative Politics in Federal Republic of Germany'' was published in 1993. Sarkar was prominent in the anti-globalization movement from 1997 to 2005 and in active in political debate. Sarkar's writings, in both English and German have been widely disseminated in numerous journals and his works have been published in English, Chinese, French and German.

Personal life 
Sarkar is married to the sociologist Maria Mies.

References 

1936 births
20th-century German writers
20th-century Indian writers
Bengali educators
Indian socialists
German socialists
Ecosocialists
German people of Bengali descent
German feminists
Indian feminist writers
Living people